The 1876 Florida gubernatorial election was held on November 7, 1876. Democratic nominee George F. Drew narrowly defeated Republican incumbent Marcellus L. Stearns with 50.51% of the vote.

General election

Candidates

Democratic 

 George F. Drew

Republican 

 Marcellus L. Stearns

Results

Results by County

See also 

 1876 United States presidential election in Florida

 1876 United States House of Representatives elections in Florida

References 

1876 Florida elections
Florida gubernatorial elections
Florida